Whiteland Community High School (or WCHS) is a public high school located in Whiteland, Indiana. It is the only high school in continuous use in the town of Whiteland.

It is a part of the Clark-Pleasant Community School Corporation, which serves Whiteland, New Whiteland, much of Greenwood, and a small section of northern Franklin.

Athletics 
Whiteland Community High School teams are named the "Warriors". 

Conference History

See also
 List of high schools in Indiana

References

External links 
Whiteland Community High School's official website
Clark-Pleasant Community School Corporation's official website

Educational institutions established in 1957
Public high schools in Indiana
Schools in Johnson County, Indiana
1957 establishments in Indiana